Borja School, Cuenca (abbreviated as UEPB) is a private Catholic pre-school, primary and secondary school for boys, located  in the Baños, Azuay district of Cuenca, Ecuador. The school was founded by the Society of Jesus in 1937 on property donated by the widow of Rafael Borja.

History
Rafael Borja School was founded in the Baños, Azuay district of Cuenca, on October 12, 1937, on property donated by Mrs. Rosa Malo. Its first location was the current one at the site of El Dorado Hotel. After two years it moved to a building next to the new Cuenca Cathedral. In 1956 the school moved again, to Pumapungo. The boarding school St. Francis Borgia was founded in 1946 at the initial headquarters of the school, and in 1959 moved to the building next to the Jesuits' Santo Cenaculo Church. Because of the archaeological importance of Pumapungo, the Central Bank of Ecuador purchased the building and the land, so the Jesuits returned to the area of Baños and built the present school.

See also

 Catholic Church in Ecuador
 Education in Ecuador
 List of Jesuit schools

References  

Jesuit secondary schools in Ecuador
Jesuit primary schools in Ecuador
Educational institutions established in 1937
1937 establishments in Ecuador
Cuenca, Ecuador